Datu Saudi Ampatuan, officially the Municipality of Datu Saudi Ampatuan (Maguindanaon: Ingud nu Datu Saudi Ampatuan; Iranun: Inged a Datu Saudi Ampatuan), is a 4th class municipality in the province of Maguindanao del Sur, Philippines. According to the 2020 census, it has a population of 31,060 people.

Etymology
The municipality was named in honor of the former mayor of Datu Piang, Maguindanao, Datu Saudi Uy Ampatuan who died due to a bomb explosion on December 24, 2002, at Datu Piang Avenue of the said municipality.

History

Datu Saudi Ampatuan was created under Muslim Mindanao Autonomy Act No. 151 on July 1, 2003, carved out of the municipality of Datu Piang.

On July 30, 2009, upon the ratification of Muslim Mindanao Autonomy Acts No. 225 (as amended by MMAA 252) and MMAA 222 (as amended by MMAA 253), the municipalities of Shariff Saydona Mustapha and Datu Salibo, respectively, were created from a total of 5 entire barangays and a portion of one barangay from Datu Saudi Ampatuan, in addition to other barangays from Datu Piang, Datu Unsay, Mamasapano and Shariff Aguak.

Datu Saudi Ampatuan mayor Samsudin Dimaukom, publicly accused by Philippine President Rodrigo Duterte of involvement in the illegal drug trade, was killed on October 28, 2016, along with nine others, by Philippine police at a highway checkpoint in what police describe as an anti-drug operation.

Geography

Barangays
Datu Saudi Ampatuan is politically subdivided into 8 barangays.
Dapiawan
Elian
Gawang
Kabengi
Kitango
Kitapok
Madia
Salbu

Climate

Demographics

Economy

Education
The Municipality has 1 Secondary School, the Dimaukom National High School formerly known as Datu Saudi Uy Ampatuan National High School with the school ID 318315. In school year 2015 - 2016 the number of students reached 444. It has 11 Regular Permanent Teachers and 6 Volunteer Teachers.

References

External links
   Datu Saudi Ampatuan Profile at the DTI Cities and Municipalities Competitive Index
 MMA Act No. 151 : An Act Creating the Municipality of Datu Saudi Ampatuan in the Province of Maguindanao
 [ Philippine Standard Geographic Code]
 Local Governance Performance Management System

Municipalities of Maguindanao del Sur
Populated places on the Rio Grande de Mindanao